Agrilinus is a genus of beetles belonging to the subfamily Aphodiinae.

The species of this genus are found in the Palearctic.

Species
These 30 species belong to the genus Agrilinus. Many of these species have been transferred from the genus Aphodius.

 Agrilinus ater (De Geer, 1774)
 Agrilinus bardus (Balthasar, 1946)
 Agrilinus bollowi (Balthasar, 1941)
 Agrilinus breviusculus (Motschulsky, 1866)
 Agrilinus constans (Duftschmid, 1805)
 Agrilinus convexus (Erichson, 1848)
 Agrilinus hasegawai (Nomura & Nakane, 1951)
 Agrilinus ibericus (Harold, 1874)
 Agrilinus ishidai (Masumoto & Kiuchi, 1987)
 Agrilinus lindbergi (Petrovitz, 1959)
 Agrilinus lungaiensis (Petrovitz, 1962)
 Agrilinus madara (Nakane, 1960)
 Agrilinus monicae (Stebnicka, 1982)
 Agrilinus monikae Král, 2013
 Agrilinus montisamator (Balthasar, 1965)
 Agrilinus nikolajevi (Berlov, Kalinina & Nikolajev, 1989)
 Agrilinus obliviosus (Reitter, 1892)
 Agrilinus pirinensis (Balthasar, 1946)
 Agrilinus pseudolungaiensis Mencl & Rakovič, 2012
 Agrilinus punctator (Reitter, 1892)
 Agrilinus ritsukoae (Kawai, 2004)
 Agrilinus shilenkovi (Berlov, 1989)
 Agrilinus shukronajevi (Nikolajev, 1998)
 Agrilinus spinulosus (Schmidt, 1910)
 Agrilinus striatus (Schmidt, 1910)
 Agrilinus surdus (Boucomont, 1929)
 Agrilinus tashigaonae (Emberson & Stebnicka, 2001)
 Agrilinus tenax (Balthasar, 1932)
 Agrilinus uniformis (Waterhouse, 1875)
 Agrilinus wassuensis (Petrovitz, 1962)

References

Scarabaeidae
Scarabaeidae genera